Scrobipalpa phelotris is a moth in the family Gelechiidae. It was described by Edward Meyrick in 1909. It is found in South Africa.

The forewings are whitish ochreous, irregularly and suffusedly mixed throughout with brownish and rather dark fuscous. The stigmata are ferruginous with one or two dark fuscous scales, cloudy, indistinct, the plical obliquely before the first discal. There are indications of very indistinct dark fuscous dots around the posterior part of the costa and termen. The hindwings are grey whitish.

References

Endemic moths of South Africa
Scrobipalpa
Moths described in 1909